The 2013 Nippon Professional Baseball (NPB) Draft was held on October 24, for the 49th time at the Grand Prince Hotel Takanawa to assign amateur baseball players to the NPB.　It was arranged with the special cooperation of Taisho Pharmaceutical with official naming rights. The draft was officially called "The Professional Baseball Draft Meeting supported by Lipovitan D ".

Summary 
Only the first round picks will be done by bid lottery. After the second round, waver selections were made in order from the lowest-ranked team of the 2013 season in both the Central and Pacific League, the third round was reversed and selections were made from the top team, and the fourth round was reversed again, alternating with selections from the lowest-ranked team until all teams had finished selecting players.

Since the  season, the winner of the NPB All-Star Game has determined whether the Central League or the Pacific League gets waiver preference after the second round. However, the 2013 All-Star Game ended with a 1-1-1 record, so the decision was made by lot, with the Pacific League receiving waiver preference.

First Round Contested Picks 

 Bolded teams indicate who won the right to negotiate contract following a lottery.
 In the first round, Kazumasa Yoshida (pitcher) was selected by the Buffaloes and Tomoya Mori (catcher) by the Lions in the first round without a bid lottery.
 In the second round, Shota Suzuki (pitcher) was selected by the Dragons and Seiji Kobayashi (catcher) by the Giants without a bid lottery.
 In the thrird round, Ren Kajiya (pitcher) was selected by the Hawks without a bid lottery.
 In the fourth round, the last remaining the Fighters, selected Ryo Watanabe (Infielder).

 List of selected players.

Selected Players 

The order of the teams is the order of second round waiver priority.
 Bolded After that, a developmental player who contracted as a registered player under control.
 List of selected players.

Hokkaido Nippon-Ham Fighters

Tokyo Yakult Swallows

Orix Buffaloes

Yokohama DeNA Baystars

Fukuoka Softbank Hawks

Chunichi Dragons

Chiba Lotte Marines

Hiroshima Carp

Saitama Seibu Lions

Hanshin Tigers

Tohoku Rakuten Golden Eagles

Yomiuri Giants

References

External links 
 プロ野球ドラフト会議 supported by リポビタンD - NPB.jp Nippon Professional Baseball

Nippon Professional Baseball draft
Draft
Nippon Professional Baseball draft
Nippon Professional Baseball draft
Baseball in Japan
Sport in Tokyo
Events in Tokyo